Knut Grøholt (born 18 June 1942) is a Norwegian civil servant.

He was born in Oslo, was educated with the siv.øk. degree and later took the Ph.D. degree. He was hired in the Norwegian Ministry of Local Government and Labour in 1973, and was promoted to deputy under-secretary of state in 1985. From 1990 to 1996 he was the permanent under-secretary of state in the Ministry of Government Administration and Labour, and in 1996 he was appointed as CEO of Vinmonopolet.

In 1992 he applied unsuccessfully for the position as director of the Research Council of Norway.

He has been the chair of Arbeidsgiverforeningen NAVO and of the Norwegian Institute for Cultural Heritage Research.

References

1942 births
Living people
Civil servants from Oslo